This is a list of bridges documented by the Historic American Engineering Record in the U.S. state of Indiana.

Bridges

See also
List of covered bridges in Indiana

References

List
List
Indiana
Bridges
Bridges